The word filament, which is descended from Latin filum meaning "thread", is used in English for a variety of thread-like structures, including:

Astronomy
 Galaxy filament, the largest known cosmic structures in the universe
 Solar filament, a solar prominence seen against the disc of the sun

Biology
 Myofilament, filaments of myofibrils constructed from proteins
 Protein filament, a long chain of protein subunits, such as those found in hair or muscle
 Part of a stamen, the male part of a flower
 Hypha, a thread-like cell in fungi and Actinobacteria
 Filamentation, an elongation of individual bacterial cells

Textiles
 Fiber, natural or manmade substances significantly longer than they are wide
 Yarn (more loosely)
 Filament fiber, fiber that comes in a continuous long length

Media
 Filament (magazine), a female-oriented erotica magazine
 2002 movie by Jinsei Tsuji
 Filament (band), a musical group from Japan
 Filament Games, a Wisconsin-based educational video game developer
 Filament Productions, a production design and touring video company

Physics and engineering
 Electrical filament, The thin wire in an electrical bulb that produces enough heat to give out light.
 Heater filament, a thin heating element in a vacuum tube
 Current filament, a current restricted to a small part of the conducting medium
 Filament propagation, diffractionless propagation of a light beam
 3D printing filament, used as raw material in 3D printing

See also
 Monofilament (disambiguation)